"Burgerboss" is the fourth episode of the second season of the animated comedy series Bob's Burgers and the overall 17th episode, and is written by Scott Jacobson and directed by Jennifer Coyle. It aired on Fox in the United States on April 1, 2012.

Plot

Bob has a classic arcade game called Burgerboss installed in the restaurant in the hopes that the game can help them make enough money to buy a new vent hood for the kitchen, with Linda thinking that they can use the money to get sailing lessons. Jimmy Pesto notices the new addition to Bob's Burgers and, being an aficionado of Burgerboss himself, decides to play a round. Jimmy plays so well that he gets the top overall score, but when he goes to enter his name he puts "BOB SUX" instead to taunt his longtime rival.

An angry Bob decides to try to knock "BOB SUX" off the leaderboard despite Linda's worry that this is going to turn into another "peeing race" between the two. Bob dismisses Linda and plays the game nonstop for most of the next few days, including after hours, until Teddy notices that he may be suffering from "the carpal tunnels" because his fingers are crooked. Bob visits a doctor, who puts him on painkillers and gives him wrist braces to wear to alleviate the pain but, in spite of this, refuses to stop playing. Linda has the arcade machine taken out of the restaurant, driving Bob into a rage because now he cannot knock Jimmy Pesto off the board.

Undeterred, Bob decides to track the game down and finds it at a local arcade called Family Funtime. The security guard on duty refuses to let him in, however, because the arcade policy does not allow adults to enter without a child present. Bob quickly returns home to grab Tina, Gene, and Louise and tells Linda they have a "thing" to go to, letting her believe they are going to their first sailing lesson. Instead, he takes them to Family Funtime so he can get back to playing Burgerboss. Louise suggests the kids pass the time by crashing birthday parties.

While Bob is playing the game, a kid walks up to him and watches his progress. After Bob tells him to go away, he warns Bob of an oncoming enemy in the game. When Bob wonders how the kid knew, he looks around to see that he is dealing with the person who has the high score on every other machine in the arcade, "DRL". Embarrassed, Bob seeks the advice of the kid, whose name is Darryl, on how to play better. Darryl agrees to help him on the condition that Bob beats up a bully named Tyler for him.

Over the next few days, Bob and the kids return to Family Funtime multiple times. Bob continues to get better at Burgerboss, while also abusing his painkillers to the point where he becomes high and hallucinates, while the kids keep enjoying themselves at birthday parties. Eventually Louise decides they should crash the Commodores' Ball at the yacht club next door.

Around the same time, Tyler comes into Family Funtime looking for Darryl. Bob, however, is in no condition to fight and he passes out. Tyler responds by punching Darryl for his actions, but Bob quickly wakes up. Finding himself in the middle of a drug-induced hallucination that Darryl is being attacked by a chicken leg from Burgerboss, Bob springs to life and shoves Tyler down. Suddenly fearing for his safety, Tyler bolts out of the arcade as Bob chases him. Tyler comes charging into the yacht club, where his father happens to be the president, and tells him that Bob is trying to kill him. Security tackles Bob, but he continues to try and fight them off.

Tyler's father calls Linda, who is surprised to hear from him and believes that she is receiving a surprise, to come down to the club immediately. Linda  heads down to the club to discover that the kids have stolen regatta pennants and oyster forks, in addition to several trays of food that Gene has eaten, and that Bob has not been taking the kids for sailing lessons but instead is still trying to beat Jimmy Pesto.

Bob, meanwhile, has been fighting off security and when he sees Linda, he believes that she is a character from Burgerboss and tries to enlist her help. Jimmy Pesto just happens to be at the party, being at the top of the waiting list for membership in the yacht club, and when he sees what is going on he once again taunts Bob over "BOB SUX". Linda chides him for his actions, blaming Jimmy for Bob's actions and saying that this is the result of another "peeing race". The membership is appalled by Linda's statement, and thinks that Bob and Jimmy engage in illicit sexual acts. Thus, Jimmy is rejected for membership and Linda drags Bob out of the club, with the Belchers banned from the club for life.

The next day, Darryl drops by the restaurant. Having been inspired by Bob, he has decided to face his bullying issues head on in the hopes of avoiding a future where he ends up being like Bob, who is still struggling with his own bully. Bob pays him under the table to get "BOB SUX" off the leader board.

Reception
The episode received a 1.7 rating and was watched by a total of 3.66 million people. This made it the fourth most watched show on Animation Domination that night, beating The Cleveland Show, but losing to The Simpsons, American Dad! and Family Guy with 5.05 million. Rowan Kaiser of The A.V. Club gave the episode an A, saying "And yes, this episode was ridiculously funny, but the cherry on top of it all? It was still heartwarming and meaningful from a characterization perspective. Honestly, the characterization and humor were both so good in “Burgerboss” that I have no idea how Bob’s Burgers can top this episode. But I’m starting to respect that they can, and that will be an interesting day."

References

External links
 
 
"Burgerboss Fan Game" at GPAnimations.com

2012 American television episodes
Bob's Burgers (season 2) episodes